...Upon My Wicked Son is the first solo album by Andy Prieboy, released in 1990. The album cover is "Fallen Angel" by David Sandlin.

"On the Road Again" is a cover of the Canned Heat song, whose lyrics inspired the album's title. The song "Tomorrow, Wendy", about the suicide of a friend of Prieboy's, bears the rare distinction of having a cover version released (on Concrete Blonde's Bloodletting, 15 May 1990) before the original album was released. Prieboy's version of the song features Concrete Blonde's singer Johnette Napolitano on vocals.

Track listing 
 "On the Road Again" (Jim Oden) – 4:44 Performer – Beth Hooker
 "To the Dogs" (Prieboy) – 4:09
 "Montezuma Was a Man of Faith" (Prieboy) – 3:34
 "Tomorrow, Wendy" (Prieboy) – 4:44 Performer – Johnette Napolitano
 "Nearer to Morning" (Prieboy, Ned Leukhardt) – 3:24
 "Man Talk" (Prieboy) – 4:45
 "Loving the Highway Man" (Prieboy) – 3:32
 "The New York Debut of an L.A. Artist (Jazz Crowd)" (Prieboy) – 2:20
 "Joliet" (Prieboy) – 3:27
 "That Was the Voice" (Prieboy) – 3:51
 "For Love" (Prieboy) – 3:05
 "Maybe That's Not Her Head" (Prieboy) – 3:22
 "Big Rock Finish" (Prieboy, Ned Leukhardt) – 3:52

Note: "Maybe That's Not Her Head" and "Big Rock Finish" do not appear on the vinyl release of the album.

Personnel 
From CD liner notes
 Backing vocals – Dee La Duke, Estefan Bravo, Jeff Hlavary, Joe Chamberlain, John Maxwell, Ken Petrosky, Steve Siegrist, Sue Rawley, Terry Gahan, Trudy Trulove
 Bass – Scott Thunes
 Drums – Dave Scott
 Drums, percussion, drum programming – Ned Leukhardt
 Engineer – Barry Rudolph, Francis Buckley, Joe Tortoricci*, Mike Fennel, Ryan Greene
 Guitar – Marc Moreland, Mikal Reid
 Guitar, piano, keyboards – Andy Prieboy
 Mixed by – Barry Rudolph, Francis Buckley
 Painting [Cover Painting] – David Sandlin
 Photography by – Reggie Ige
 Producer – Andy Prieboy
 Programmed by [Computer] – Mike Fennel
 Trombone – David Dean
 Violin – Michael Barberra*
 Written by – Andy Prieboy (tracks: 2 to 13)

 Notes
From LP liner notes
 Johnette Napolitano appears courtesy of I.R.S. Records.
 Dave Scott appears by the grace of MCA Records and Kill For Thrills.
 Michael Barberra appears through the benevolence of Mary's Danish.
 The artist's home features the collection of Gretchen Victor.
 The cover painting "Fallen Angel" was painted by David Sandlin and licensed through the courtesy of Gracie Mansion Gallery. It comes from the collection of Danny Elfman. For more information on the artist please write: Gracie Mansion Gallery, 532 Broadway, New York, NY 10012.

References

External links 
 Discogs – ...Upon My Wicked Son – CD 1990, Doctor Dream Records (DDCD 9030) US
 Discogs – ...Upon My Wicked Son – LP 1990, Musidisc (106651) France

1990 debut albums
Andy Prieboy albums
Doctor Dream Records albums